The Schreckhorn Hut (German: Schreckhornhütte) is a mountain hut of the Swiss Alpine Club, located south of Grindelwald in the canton of Bern. The hut lies at a height of 2,529 metres above sea level, above the Lower Grindelwald Glacier, at the foot of the Schreckhorn in the Bernese Alps.

From Grindelwald and Pfingstegg a trail leads to the hut via Bäregg.

References
Swisstopo topographic maps

External links
Official website

Mountain huts in Switzerland
Buildings and structures in the canton of Bern
Mountain huts in the Alps